James Gregory Bonnen (born June 18, 1966) is an American politician. He served as a Republican member for the 24th district of the Texas House of Representatives.

Bonnen was born in Angleton, Texas. He attended Texas A&M University, where he earned a Bachelor of Science in biochemistry. He attended medical school and became a neurosurgeon and an assistant professor. In 2013, he won the election for the 24th district of the Texas House of Representatives. Bonnen succeeded Larry Taylor. He assumed his office on January 8, 2013.

References 

1966 births
Living people
People from Angleton, Texas
Republican Party members of the Texas House of Representatives
21st-century American politicians
Texas A&M University alumni
American neurosurgeons